Galium mollugo, common name hedge bedstraw or false baby's breath, is a herbaceous perennial plant of the family Rubiaceae. It shares the name hedge bedstraw with the related European species, Galium album.

Description
The stems are square in cross-section, more or less erect with ascending branches. Starting from the axils of leaves it has inflorescences of small white flowers with a diameter of about 1 to 1.5 cm, with four petals. The flowering period extends from May to September.

Habitat

Distribution
Galium mollugo is widely distributed in Europe and North Africa from Denmark, Portugal and Morocco east to the Altay region of Siberia and to the Caucasus. It is naturalized in the Russian Far East, New Zealand, Norfolk Island, Greenland, Argentina, Uruguay, and much of North America. It has been reported from the Rocky Mountains, the Cascade Range, the Sierra Nevadas and the Appalachian Mountains as well as the Great Lakes region. It is classified as a noxious weed in New York, Pennsylvania and much of New England.

References

External links

Biolib Galium mollugo
Flora of Northern Ireland Galium mollugo
Plants Database Galium mollugo
Plants for a Future Galium mollugo
Wilde Planten in Nederland en Belgie, Glad walstro, Galium mollugo

mollugo
Flora of Europe
Flora of Russia
Flora of Siberia
Plants described in 1753
Taxa named by Carl Linnaeus